Cricklewood railway station is on the Midland Main Line in England, serving the town of Cricklewood in the London Borough of Barnet, north London. Its three-letter station code is CRI.

It is served by Thameslink services on the cross-London Thameslink route. It is in Travelcard Zone 3.

History

It was opened on 2 May 1870 as Childs Hill and Cricklewood nearly 2 years after the Midland Railway had built its extension (now called the Midland Main Line) to St. Pancras. The station acquired its present name in 1903.

To the north of the station, a motive power depot was built with a large roundhouse in 1882, with a second in 1893.  With this was built a large marshalling yard and, in later years, LMS Garratts would be seen with their massive trains of coal from Toton in the Nottinghamshire and Derbyshire coalfields.
A loop line, no longer in existence, was built heading north on the western side of the railway yard, then turning east underneath the main line at the viaduct over the River Brent (and also now the North Circular Road), then south on the eastern side. This obviously allowed trains to reverse direction, but also conveniently joined the railway yards on the two sides of the main lines.

Between 1899 and 1926, a number of proposals were put forward to build an underground railway along the Edgware Road from Central London to Cricklewood via Kilburn, and envisaged the construction of a Tube station at Cricklewood. None of the schemes succeeded and the line was never built.

A mural bearing the inscription  (which was a nickname the British press gave Amy Johnson) was painted in Cricklewood station to commemorate the hundred-year anniversary of women getting the right to vote in the United Kingdom.

Facilities
This station has 4 platforms, numbered from 1 (easternmost) to 4 (westernmost). Platforms 1 and 2 are on the southbound and northbound slow lines, where all regular services calling at the station use. Platforms 3 and 4 are on the southbound and northbound fast lines, which are normally fenced off while fast trains pass through this station non-stop, and only to be used when the slow lines are out of use.

Services
Thameslink run 24-hour services on the Thameslink route. The typical off-peak service is four trains per hour between St Albans and Sutton, with two of them going via Wimbledon and the other two going via Mitcham Junction. Thameslink services to and from Gatwick Airport, Three Bridges and Brighton stop here at night only, but pass through without stopping during the day. After midnight, an hourly service (not calling at Farringdon, City Thameslink or London Bridge) from Bedford to Three Bridges runs.

East Midlands Railway InterCity services from Sheffield, Nottingham, Leicester and run through at high speed on the Midland Main Line, but do not stop. Interchange with these services can be made at Luton and St Pancras International.

From March 2009, Southeastern and Thameslink began running some peak hour trains from Sevenoaks to Luton, though in the off-peak these services turn back at Kentish Town. From 2015, following the expansion of the Thameslink network, other trains from south of the River Thames have been able to call at the station; however, it is not possible to accommodate longer 12-car trains at Cricklewood as the platforms are constrained by a road bridge and cannot be extended.

Development

In 2014, the pedestrian subway of Cricklewood station was refurbished with renewed cladding, lighting and a repaired floor, and disabled access was improved at the ticket office window.

Various schemes have been proposed for improved railway connections through Cricklewood. In early 2008, the London Group of the Campaign for Better Transport pressure group published a proposal for a light rail system in West London called the North and West London Light railway (NWLLR), which would make use of the Dudding Hill freight line freight corridor that runs through Cricklewood station. The NWLLR scheme did not progress beyond the proposal stage.

Plans to build a new  station  to the north of Cricklewood are currently progressing, and the scheme was approved by national and London government in March 2014. Unlike Cricklewood, the new station will be able to accommodate the new 12-carriage trains. Rumours that Cricklewood station would close when the new station opened have been refuted by the Brent Cross Cricklewood development company. The developers announced funding for further upgrade work at Cricklewood station in 2010, including the installation of lifts to provide step-free access to all platforms.

The proposal to re-open the Dudding Hill Line to passenger services was revived in 2017 when the London Assembly and Transport for London published a plan to extend the London Overground network through Cricklewood. The plans are currently at public consultation stage with TfL.

Connections
London Buses routes 189, 226, 245, 260, 460 and C11 serve the station.

Cricklewood TMD and sidings

The original Cricklewood railway engine servicing depot was built by the Midland Railway just to the north west of curve of the junction with the Dudding Hill Line. It was built as and remains as the first major servicing depot for trains terminating in London, and for servicing the local regional commuter trains on the Midland Main Line. Part rebuilt by British Railways, it was closed to steam in December 1964.

To the eastern side of the mainline, the Midland Railway had originally built a goods yard, which developed into a sizeable freight facility under British Railways, for collating and distributing goods around London. Resultantly, as the confines of the original depot with the introduction of electrification meant it could no longer be used, a new depot was built to the north east of the mainline, located directly north of the sidings and above the northern junction with the Dudding Hill Line.

Today, the depot serves as the London base for East Midlands Railway, providing stabling and operational servicing for its British Rail Class 222 and class 180. It also formerly served as a regional depot for First Capital Connect, until it was superseded by Govia Thameslink Railway in September 2014, who use other newly built facilities in other locations. The sidings located to its south still provide freight services, including being the starting point for one of the daily BinLiner domestic waste trains that terminate at the  Landfill site, operated by the Waste Recycling Group for the Department of the Environment.

Service pattern

References

Railway stations in the London Borough of Barnet
DfT Category E stations
Former Midland Railway stations
Railway stations in Great Britain opened in 1870
Railway stations served by Govia Thameslink Railway
Railway station